Zaneis is an unincorporated community in Carter County, Oklahoma, United States. It is located along US-70 in the western part of the county. Zaneis is located south-southwest of Healdton and west-northwest of Wilson.

Notable person
Tom Tipps, Oklahoma businessman and legislator

References

Unincorporated communities in Carter County, Oklahoma
Unincorporated communities in Oklahoma